Megacraspedus eburnellus is a moth of the family Gelechiidae. It was described by Peter Huemer and Ole Karsholt in 2001. It is found in Italy.

Etymology
The species name refers to the characteristic colour of the forewing and is derived from eburneus (meaning cream coloured).

References

Moths described in 2001
Megacraspedus